The 2015–16 UAE President's Cup is the 40th season of the UAE President's Cup, the premier knockout tournament for association football clubs in the United Arab Emirates. winners will qualify for the group stage of the 2017 AFC Champions League.

Round of 16
Al Wahda 3-4 (E) Al Wasl

Emirates (E) 5-3 Al Fujairah

Al Ahli (E) 4-0 Ajman

Dibba Al Fujairah 1-4 (E) Al Shaab

Al Shabab 1-2 (E) Bani Yas

Al Ain 4-0 Al Ittihad Kalba

Al Sharjah 5-4 Al Nasr

Al Dhafra 0-1 Al Jazira

Quarter-finals
Al Ain (E) 4-2 Al Wasl
		More info
Al Jazira (P) 4-4 Al Sharjah

Al Shaab 1-3 Al Ahli

Emirates 1-1 (P) Bani Yas

Semi-finals
Al Ahli 2-3 Al Jazira

Al Ain (E) 3-2 Bani Yas

Final
29 may 2016

Al Ain 1-1 (5-6) Al Jazira

Al Jazira Won UAE President's Cup

References

External links
2015–16 UAE President's Cup, Soccerway.com

UAE President's Cup seasons
2015–16 in Emirati football